Matthew Brickdale (30 April 17358 September 1831) was an English politician who was a Member of Parliament for Bristol from 1768 to 1774 and from 1780 to 1790.

References 

1735 births
1831 deaths